Tonna alanbeui is a species of large sea snail, a marine gastropod mollusk in the family Tonnidae, the tun shells.

Description

Distribution

References

External links

Tonnidae
Gastropods described in 2005